Sabah Trade Centre is a trade centre building in Kota Kinabalu, Sabah, Malaysia. The building located at an approximately 100,000 square feet area reaching the height of 70 feet and divided into two levels. It is managed by Sabah Trade and Industry Consultancy Sdn. Bhd. (STIC), under the State Department of Industrial Development and Research, Ministry of Industrial Development of the Government of Sabah.

Features 
The first level of the building has 50,000 square feet usable space comprising the main exhibition hall, foyer, meeting rooms, office and preparation rooms while the second level has 35,000 square feet usable space consisting of permanent exhibition area, office space and cafeteria. The building is opened for booking of exhibitions, conferences, seminars and meetings.

Events 
The building became the centre of exhibition for the BIMP-EAGA between Brunei, Indonesia, Malaysia and the Philippines. In 2019, the country major book fair of Big Bad Wolf Books held a fair in the building.

References 

Buildings and structures in Kota Kinabalu